Thomas Bruins is a dual national Australian and Netherlands Elite duathlete from Perth, Australia. Competing at Elite level he has won Asian and Oceania Continental Duathlon  Championships as well as  Powerman Duathlon World Series races in Putrajaya (Malaysia 2016), Jakarta (Indonesia 2017 and 2018) and Bangkok (Thailand 2018). He finished the 2017 Powerman World Series in second place, reaching a World ranking lead  in 2017. Selected to compete for the Netherlands Elite team at the OTU Oceania and ASTC Asian Continental Championships and the ITU World Elite long distance duathlon championships Powerman Zofingen (Switzerland).

Sporting career
Thomas Bruins lives and trains in Perth (AUS)

References

Living people
Australian male triathletes
Duathletes
Year of birth missing (living people)
21st-century Australian people